William Brabazon, 11th Earl of Meath (1803 – 26 May 1887) was an Irish Peer and MP.

He was the eldest surviving son of John Chambre Brabazon, 10th Earl of Meath and Lady Melosina Adelaide Meade, daughter of John Meade, 1st Earl of Clanwilliam and Theodosia Hawkins-Magill He was educated at Eton College and Christ Church, Oxford. He was known as Lord Brabazon between 1826 and 1851, after which he succeeded his father as the 11th Earl of Meath and the 2nd Baronet Chaworth.

He was elected MP for County Dublin in 1830–1832 and 1837–1841 and appointed a Privy Councillor in 1839.

He was appointed High Sheriff of County Dublin for 1835–36 and High Sheriff of Wicklow for 1848–49 and Lord Lieutenant and custos rotulorum of County Wicklow from 1869 until his death in 1887. He was Colonel of the County Dublin militia from 1847 to 1881 and Hon. Colonel of the 5th battalion, Royal Dublin Fusiliers. He was an aide-de-camp to Queen Victoria.

He married in 1837 Harriot, the daughter of Sir Richard Brooke, 6th Baronet, of Norton Priory, Cheshire and Harriot Cuniffe, with whom he had two sons, Jacques, who died young, and Reginald, and a daughter Kathleen, who died unmarried. The family lived at Kilruddery House, in Bray, County Wicklow, which is still the seat of the Earls of Meath. On his death in 1887 he was succeeded by his surviving son Reginald Brabazon, 12th Earl of Meath, a career diplomat.

References

External links 
 

1803 births
1887 deaths
People educated at Eton College
Alumni of Christ Church, Oxford
High Sheriffs of County Dublin
High Sheriffs of Wicklow
Members of the Parliament of the United Kingdom for County Dublin constituencies (1801–1922)
UK MPs 1830–1831
UK MPs 1837–1841
UK MPs who inherited peerages
Members of the Privy Council of Ireland
Lord-Lieutenants of Dublin
William
11